Allen Hershkowitz is an American environmental scientist who worked as a senior scientist at Natural Resources Defense Council from 1988 to 2014 and then at the Green Sports Alliance until 2016, when he left to become a Founding Director and Chairman of Sport and Sustainability International. Hershkowitz is currently Environmental Science Advisor to the New York Yankees, the first role of its kind in professional sports, as well as Co-Chair of the WELL Health-Safety Rating for Facility Operations and Management of Sports and Entertainment Venues, created by the International WELL Building Institute (IWBI).

Career 
Hershkowitz started working at the Natural Resources Defense Council (NRDC) in 1988.

At an NRDC staff retreat in 2004, board member Robert Redford suggested that the NRDC establish more of a presence at professional sporting events; Hershkowitz told a reporter from Mother Jones: "We were trying to figure out how to reach out to untraditional allies, and Redford says to us, 'You know, if you want to meet Americans, you’ve got to go to a baseball game or a football game. You’ve got to go to one of these stadiums. That’s where America is.'"  Hershkowitz met with Bud Selig of Major League Baseball (MLB) shortly after that, and soon the NRDC was creating white papers and teams to advise all the major sports leagues about environmental sustainability initiatives that addressed each sport's needs and could help them save money.  Hershkowitz directed the Sports Greening Initiative at the NRDC. 

In 2007, the Academy of Motion Picture Arts and Sciences approached the NRDC for advice about how to reduce the carbon footprint of the Oscar Awards show, after the academy was asked to do so by one of the producers of An Inconvenient Truth.  Hershkowitz, in his role as a senior scientist at the NRDC, helped them from 2007 to 2011.  Similarly, The Recording Academy asked the NRDC for help greening the Grammy Awards starting in 2008, and Hershkowitz led that effort as well.

Hershkowitz was dubbed "The Godfather of Greening" in a 2009 article by Yoga International writer Anna Dubrovsky.

Hershkowitz was listed as the 50th most influential person in the field of sports business by Sports Business Journal in December 2015.  By the time of the listing, he had provided environmental sustainability advice to the NBA, the NHL, MLB, Major League Soccer, and the U.S. Tennis Association that, according to the listing, had saved the leagues millions of dollars.

The Green Sports Alliance got started in the late 2000s as informal discussions among management of the six major professional league sports teams in the Pacific Northwest, about how to improve their operations' sustainability. The idea of formalizing an alliance was generated in a meeting between Hershkowitz and representatives of sports teams owned by Paul Allen via Vulcan Inc., and GSA formally launched in the spring of 2011, with NRDC as one of the founding organizations.  In 2014 Hershkowitz left the NRDC and became president of the GSA.

In December 2015, the GSA under Hershkowitz's leadership helped organize two summits on sports sustainability at the 2015 United Nations Climate Change Conference  The participation of representatives from major American professional sports associations marked the first time the sports industry were directly involved with climate change initiatives by the United Nations.

In June 2016 Hershkowitz left the GSA to focus on more global issues.  In December 2016 Sport and Sustainability International was formally launched; Hershkowitz was a member of its organizing committee, along with four other founding directors.

In a 2017 profile following the launch of Sport and Sustainability International, writer Lew Blaustein said about Hershkowitz, "Having created the greening programs at MLB, NBA, NHL, the USTA, and co-founded and served as President of the Green Sports Alliance, it is no exaggeration to say that Hershkowitz is the most consequential environmentalist in the history of North American sports. Hershkowitz is now globalizing his scope of influence as he helps develop Sustainability and Sports International (SandSI)."

On January 27, 2019, a Holocaust Remembrance Day public reading of Hershkowitz’s memoir “Finding My Father’s Auschwitz File” took place in NYC at the Sheen Center for Thought and Culture: https://www.youtube.com/watch?v=oXVo92EzTS0&t=14s&ab_channel=SheenTalks

In November 2019, Hershkowitz received a Townsend Harris Medal from his alma mater, The City College of New York, which are awarded for "recognition of outstanding postgraduate achievement in their chosen fields."

Publications

References

External links
Column archive at The Huffington Post

Year of birth missing (living people)
Living people
Environmental scientists
American environmentalists
American non-fiction environmental writers
Environmental bloggers
Natural Resources Defense Council people
American sports businesspeople